Juventud La Joya is a Peruvian football club, playing in the city of Chancay District, Huaral, Lima, Peru.

History
The club was founded on the Chancay District, Huaral, Lima. 

Juventud La Joya played in the 1983 Copa Perú, but remained in the fourth place. 

The club participated in the Peruvian Primera División, since 1985 Torneo Descentralizado until 1988 Torneo Descentralizado. In the 1987 Torneo Descentralizado, the club fused with the Centro Iqueño, to form the team La Joya–Iqueño.

In 1989, Juventud La Joya sold the category to the Meteor, and participated until 1990 Torneo Descentralizado.

In 1991 Segunda División, the club fused with the Lawn Tennis, to form the team Meteor–Lawn Tennis until 1994.

In 1998 Segunda División, the club fused with the Deportivo Junín, to form the team Meteor–Junín until 1999, when was relegated to the Copa Perú.

Actually, Juventud La Joya play in the Liga Distrital de Asia.

Honours

Regional
Liga Departamental de Lima:
Winners (1): 1982

Liga Provincial de Huaral:
Winners (1): 1982

Liga Distrital de Chancay:
Winners (1): 1982

See also
List of football clubs in Peru
Peruvian football league system

External links
 Peruvian First Division 1985, 1986, 1987 and 1988

Football clubs in Peru
Association football clubs established in 1971